Girls High School in San Francisco, California, was established in 1865 and was discontinued in 1952.

Founding
The city's Board of Education declared on July 25, 1865, that the existing Rincon School would thenceforth be an "all-girls school". It had ninety seats assigned to it.

On September 18, 1868, the Board of Education authorized the expenditure of $25,000 to erect a Girls High School on the southeast corner of Stockton and Bush streets, where the existing building stood.

In 1869, the expense of educating one student in the Boys High School, later renamed Lowell High School, was $116.64 and one student in Girls High was $68.64.

Faculty
In 1889, "Eighty or more" students signed a petition on behalf of teacher Jessie Smith, who had been singled out for dismissal, ostensibly by a new vice principal who wanted to hire a teacher from the Eastern United States. Others, however, said that the proposed dismissal was occasioned by a rumor that Smith had Negro ancestry. She and her brothers denied that was the case, her ancestry being "three-fourths English and one-fourth Irish." In 1891 Smith was president of the San Francisco Teachers Mutual Aid Association.

Campus
In 1892, a new building was completed at Geary and Scott streets. A grand jury indicted the contractor, J.P. McCormick, and others for collusion to defraud the county treasury.

The school auditorium, ten classrooms, and locker rooms were destroyed by fire that swept through the O'Farrell Street wing at Scott Street the morning of August 19, 1934. Eleven firemen were injured, some of them trapped under a falling ceiling. The fire was blamed on sparks from a worker's blowtorch during work on the building, which was surrounded by scaffolding.

Discipline

In 1988, a group of graduates recalled that gum chewing was forbidden in the 1920s. "So was Charleston dancing in the hallways, smoking in the toilets and sneaking downtown for chocolate sundaes."

Closure

The last term ended in spring 1952, and the campus became Benjamin Franklin Junior High School. At that time the school was in an area considered to be blighted.

List of principals

 E.H. Holmes, 1865
 John Swett, resigned July 1889 The School Board was dissatisfied with his administration because he had taken no steps toward the school's accreditation by the University of California and because no women had been sent to the university since 1884.
 Mary W. Kincaid, 1889–1892. She made the instruction identical with that in the Boys High School, and graduates were enabled to enter the University of California simply with their diplomas.
 Elisha Brooks, 1896–1904. During his term, Girls High became the only school west of the Rockies accredited by Vassar College. Brooks was investigated by the school board with "gross mismanagement" in that he spent his time as a farmer in the school garden instead of attending to his duties. He was also accused of mishandling a personnel matter involving the relationship between a male and a female teacher.
 Arthur W. Scott, 1904-1920s

Notable alumni
 Elizabeth Fleischmann, X-ray pioneer
 Florence Prag Kahn, teacher and Congress member

References

External links
 San Francisco Genealogy: Girls High School / Students, Faculty, Alumnae, History

Defunct high schools in California
Educational institutions established in 1865
1865 establishments in California
Educational institutions disestablished in 1952
1952 disestablishments in California
Girls' schools in California